Sabile Municipality was an administrative unit (2000-2009) of the Talsi District, Latvia.

Towns, villages and settlements of Sabile Municipality 
 Sabile
 Valgale
 Veģi
 Lielvirbi

Former municipalities of Latvia